Alexandra Cadanțu and Cristina Dinu were the defending champions, but Dinu chose not to participate. Cadanțu partnered Ekaterina Yashina, but they were defeated in the final by Ivana Jorović and Lesley Kerkhove, 6–3, 7–5.

Seeds

Draw

References 
 Draw

Open Engie de Touraine - Doubles